Juan XXIII is a metrocable station on line J of the Medellín Metro. The station is located in the Juan XXIII neighborhood of the San Javier commune. This station covers communes 13 (San Javier) and 7 (Robledo).

References

External links
 Official site of Medellín Metro 

Medellín Metro stations